Phyllis Cox Berthoud (8 April 1887 - 1975) was a tennis player from unified Bengal, India. She participated in the Indian Open tennis tournaments between 1918 and 1923. Her entry into a Grand Slam event in 1920 for the Wimbledon singles draw was the first for an Indian woman. She died in Warwick in 1975.

References 

1887 births
1975 deaths
Indian female tennis players
Sportswomen from West Bengal
Racket sportspeople from West Bengal
British people in colonial India
People from Warwick